Brattekleiv is a village in Arendal municipality in Agder county, Norway. The village is located along the Galtesundet strait on the southwestern shore of the island of Tromøy. The smaller industrial village of Pusnes lies immediately north of Brattekleiv, the small village of Revesand lies just south of the village, and the village of Færvik lies a short distance to the east.

References

Villages in Agder
Arendal